Temple University's College of Science and Technology houses the departments of Biology, Chemistry, Computer & Information Sciences, Earth & Environmental Science, Mathematics, and Physics. It is one of the largest schools or colleges of its kind in the Philadelphia region with more than 200 faculty and 4000 undergraduate and graduate students. Michael L. Klein is dean of the college and Laura H. Carnell Professor.

Founded in 1998 from the science departments in what was then the College of Arts and Sciences, the College of Science and Technology offers bachelor's, master's, and doctoral degrees in all six departments as well as science with teaching bachelor's degrees through the TUteach program, based on the UTeach program.

Undergraduate Research Program
The College of Science and Technology offers the CST Undergraduate Research Program (URP). Students selected to participate work with a faculty sponsor to perform research in the faculty member's lab. It may also be possible for students to earn a stipend for additional work performed in the lab in excess of the required research course requirements. Students may be asked to participate in conferences, author papers or to showcase their research work in the department or at the URP Research Symposium.

Centers and Institutes for Advanced Research & Education
 Center for Advanced Photonics Research
 Center for Biophysics and Computational Biology
 Center for Computational Genetics and Genomics
 Center for Data Analytics and Biomedical Informatics
 Center for Materials Theory
 Institute for Computational Molecular Science
 Sbarro Health Research Organization

Research Support Facilities
 Research and Instructional Support Facility (RISF)
 Solid Phase Peptide Synthesis and Analysis (SPPS)
 Materials Research Facility

Notable faculty
Antonio Giordano, Biology
Michael L. Klein, Chemistry
Jie Wu, Computer & Information Sciences
Igor Rivin, Mathematics
Xiaoxing Xi, Physics

Notable alumni
F. Albert Cotton, chemist
Angelo DiGeorge, pediatric endocrinologist
Bernard Roizman, virologist
Herbert Scarf, mathematical economist

References

Temple University